(December 3, 1932 – October 28, 2007) was a Japanese politician, former Chief Cabinet Secretary and House of Representatives member.

Born in Ise, Mie Prefecture, Fujinami was first elected to the House of Representatives in 1967 as a Liberal Democratic Party member, and was elected to the House of Representatives eleven times.

Fujinami first obtained a Cabinet post in 1979 as Labor Minister under Prime Minister Masayoshi Ohira when he was serving his fifth term as a House of Representatives member.

When the Nakasone government began in 1982, Fujinami was given the post of deputy chief Cabinet secretary before becoming chief Cabinet secretary in 1983. Fujinami was seen as a prospective prime minister while serving in the post of chief Cabinet secretary from 1983 to 1985, under Prime Minister Nakasone. During his two years as chief Cabinet secretary, he helped promote Nakasone's policies, including his official visit to Yasukuni Shrine and the cancellation of the cap on Japan's defense budget of one percent of the gross national product. He also helped with Nakasone's administrative reforms, including the privatization of telephone operation and tobacco businesses.

Fujinami resigned due to his involvement in the Recruit Company shares-for-favor scandal in the late 1980s. After Nakasone left the post of prime minister in 1987 and returned to the head of an LDP faction, Fujinami supported him as secretary general of the faction.

In 1989, Fujinami was indicted on charges of accepting more than 40 million yen in money and unlisted shares as bribes from Recruit, a Tokyo-based job information conglomerate. The Tokyo District Court acquitted Fujinami in 1994, but the Tokyo High Court reversed the decision in 1997, sentencing him to three years in prison, suspended for four years. The decision was finalized by the Supreme Court in 1999.

Fujinami retired from politics in 2003 citing health reasons. He died at a hospital in Mie Prefecture, according to the LDP.

|-

|-

References

Government ministers of Japan
Members of the House of Representatives (Japan)
1932 births
2007 deaths
Liberal Democratic Party (Japan) politicians
Japanese politicians convicted of corruption
Waseda University alumni
People from Ise, Mie